Hadj Boudebza (born in Saint-Laurent-de-la-Salanque, on 1 October 1966) is a French former professional rugby league footballer who represented France at the 1995 World Cup.

Playing career
Boudebza played for Paris Saint-Germain in the 1996 Super League and in 1997 played in the Super League World Nines.

He played for France in six test matches between 1994 and 1997, including in one match at the 1995 World Cup.

Personal life
Outside the field, he worked in the family-owned meat business directed by Bernard Guasch.

His son, John is also a French rugby league international. His other son, Jordan also practiced rugby league, while his youngest son, Hugo, played both rugby codes.

Honours

Team honours
French Champion : 1993 (Saint-Estève).
Winner of the Lord Derby Cup : 1993, 1994 and 1995 (Saint-Estève).
Runner-up at the French Championship : 1992, 1995 and 1996 (Saint-Estève).

Runner-up at the Lord Derby Cup : 1997 (Limoux).

References

Living people
1966 births
French rugby league players
France national rugby league team players
Paris Saint-Germain Rugby League players
Rugby league props
Sportspeople from Pyrénées-Orientales